Caleb's Discovery is a historic home located two miles west of Berlin, Worcester County, Maryland.  The house consists of two sections, the -story kitchen wing, dating from the early 18th century, and the -story living room wing, dating from about 1820. It is a good illustration of the incorporation of an early house into a later structure without the loss of the earlier building's identity.

It was listed on the National Register of Historic Places in 1975.

References

External links
, including photo from 1974, at Maryland Historical Trust

Houses in Worcester County, Maryland
Houses on the National Register of Historic Places in Maryland
National Register of Historic Places in Worcester County, Maryland